Vrangsinn (Birthname Daniel Salte) is a Norwegian musician, best known as the bassist of Carpathian Forest (1999–2014/2019–present).

Biography
Daniel Vrangsinn is a Norwegian musician, poet, video, and graphics artist. He is most known for his bizarre stage stunts while performing live with Norwegian black metal band Carpathian Forest. He also does other artforms like concrete art, jewelry, steel crosses, and pentagrams.

Vrangsinn is the president of Misantrof ANTIRecords, a non-profit organization he established in 2007. Through this organization, he releases his own music and many other bands freely to the general public with a creative commons license. Vrangsinn sometimes also sells physical copies of releases, but according to his official homepage, Vrangsinn believes art should belong to humanity as a whole and that everyone should have equal rights to access and share the art.

Vrangsinn is also a known atheist and has published writings and poetry that is critical of religion and dogma. He is collecting these writings together with poetry about life, love, and existentialism under the name of "The art of thinking gods out of existence".

Discography

With Carpathian Forest

 Strange Old Brew 1999 (Cover Artwork and work on The Good Old Enema Treatment)
 Morbid Fascination of Death (2001)
 Defending the Throne of Evil (2003)
 Skjend Hans Lik compilation (2004)
 We're Going to Hell for This – over a decade of perversions (2004)
 We're Going to Hollywood for This – Live perversions DVD (2004)
 Fuck You All!!!! (2006)

With Vrangsinn

 Moon Psychedelia Collection (2008)
 PHOBIA (Multimedia release on DVD/CD/MP3/MP4) (2010)

With Nattefrost

 Blood & Vomit (2004) Vrangsinn produced, mixed and mastered & performed backup vocals on tracks 1, 2 and 8 and bass guitar on track 3.
 Terrorist (2005) Vrangsinn produced, mixed and mastered & performed bass guitar, lead guitar, and vocals on tracks 1, 4, 5, 7, 8, 12
 Det beste til meg og mine venner. En hyllest til Joachim Nielsen Uskyldighet (2006) Vrangsinn produced, mixed and mastered this song & Play bass
 Red Planet / Nattefrost split - Engangsgrill Vrangsinn produced, mixed and mastered the Nattefrost part of this album and mastered the Red Planet part

With A Waste of Talent

This band releases all their music on Misantrof ANTIRecords.
Their releases are free for the public to download.

A Waste of Talent was founded in 1992 but waited until 2008 to release one full-length album named Psycodelic Steamtrain. Since then they have been working on a follow up titled "The last remains of humankind" Release date or progress on this project is unknown.

A Waste of Talent play a musical style self-titled to be: "GroovyDepressive PopRockMetal with a lot of Doom!" The complete name of this band is "A Waste of Talent a.k.a. Psycodelic Steamtrain".
The music was recorded in Misantrof Studio. Engineered, mixed and mastered by Vrangsinn.

With Eirik Skrangle

 Dagen Derpå E.P (2006)
Vrangsinn plays guitar and bass, and he does backing vocals. The music has been classified as True Norwegian PunkFolkRock!!! By Misantrof ANTIRecords.

Recorded in Misantrof Studio. Produced, Engineered, mixed and mastered by Vrangsinn.

With Tsjuder

 "Norwegian Apocalypse" DVD (2006) – Vrangsinn play bass on Sacrifice – Bathory cover. Vrangsinn recorded, mixed and mastered the bonus video material at Tribute – Sandnes

With Secht

 Secht (2006) performed acoustic and electric guitars, bass, vocal, harp, pump organ, production, engineering, mixing, Mastering and sounds on their debut album.

With Hatepulse

 In Extenso Letalis (E.P – 2003)
 The Core of the Soulless (Full length – 2007)

With Neetzach

 Pinseltronen 96 re-mastered Demo (2005)
 True Servants of Satan Full length (2006)

With The No No No's

Various recordings done by Vranginn & Nattefrost 1996–2001.

Miscellaneous recordings with Vrangsinn

With The Horror Vault (Movie music)

 HELVETE Vrangsinn is listed as compozer Additional music on this feature horror film from 2008

With Bleed with me (Movie music)

 Vrangsinn is listed as composer on this feature horror film from 2009

With Bleedthrough – The making of Bleed with me (Movie music)

 Vrangsinn is listed as composer on this making of from 2009

With The Horror Vault 3 (Movie music)

 A Waste of Talent - Machines kept pumping blood from earth Vrangsinn is listed as composer of music on this feature horror film from 2010

With Beyond the morninglight

 Beyond the morninglight album (2008) Engineered, mixed and mastered by Vrangsinn

With Dingir Xul

 Cthulhu Arise Demo (2003) Engineered, mixed and mastered by Vrangsinn
 Corpse Abuse Demo (2005) Engineered, mixed and mastered by Vrangsinn

With Deathcult

 Cult of the Dragon Full length (2007) Engineered, mixed and mastered by Vrangsinn

With Duckwalk Chuck

 Comin out blastng Full length (2004) Engineered, mixed and mastered by Vrangsinn

With Upskirts

 Sidewalk Susie Demo (2005) Engineered, mixed and mastered by Vrangsinn

With Orcustus

 Wrathrash EP (2005) – Some recording & mixing
Orcustus Full length (2009) Engineered, mixed and mastered by Vrangsinn

With World Destroyer

 Diabolical Journey 14-track demo from 1999 featuring Vrangsinn, Nattefrost and Kulde.
Engineered, mixed and mastered by Vrangsinn and Nattefrost

References

External links
 http://www.vrangsinn.net/ – Official homepage
 http://www.misantrof.net/ – Misantrof
 http://hierophant-nox.com/features/label-focus-misantrof-antirecords/ – Vrangsinn interviewed about Misantrof in Hierophant Nox
 http://www.nocturnalcult.com/Vrangsinnint.htm – Vrangsinn interviewed by Nocturnal Cult Magazine
 https://archive.today/20070422180814/http://www.antenna.nu/vrangsinn/interview1.php – Vrangsinn interviewed by Antenna Magazine
 https://web.archive.org/web/20090427200815/http://heavymetal.no/show.article.asp?menuid=&artid=7156 – Vrangsinn interviewed by HeavyMetal.no (in Norwegian)
 https://www.youtube.com/watch?v=udS2RAouKN8 – "A criminal conversation" Video interview about Vrangsinn's music, philosophy and  religious views (License – CC BY-NC-SA 3.0)
 http://my.opera.com/NorthernVantage/blog/index.dml/tag/Vrangsinn – A blog writing about Misantrof
 http://www.viceland.com/issues_au/v2n2/htdocs/94.php – Vrangsinn in Viceland
 http://www.itavisen.no/php/art.php?id=369641 – Vrangsinn in It-aviesn (in Norwegian)
 http://dethklok.universityplus1.com/ – Metalocalypse, Episode "Deathstars" on Cartoon Network – Valerie Vrangsinn is named after Vrangsinn
 https://www.imdb.com/name/nm2930067/ – Vrangsinn at Internet Movie Database

1974 births
Critics of religions
Living people
Norwegian heavy metal bass guitarists
Norwegian male bass guitarists
Norwegian black metal musicians
Norwegian multi-instrumentalists
Norwegian atheists
Carpathian Forest members
Musicians from Stavanger
21st-century Norwegian bass guitarists
21st-century Norwegian male musicians